Dedemli is a town in Konya Province, Turkey

Geography

Dedemli is in the rural area of Hadim district which is a part of Konya Province. It is situated just at the west of headwaters of Göksu River and a few kilometers north of  Korualan another mountain town. Dedemli is quite far from the main highways. The population is 2088 as of 2011

History

According to legend, the town had been founded by a sheikh (Islamic scholar) named Bayram Seydi Veli from Khorosan in the 15th century. In fact the name of the town means with my grandfather where grandfather in this context, means sheikh. In 1968, the town was declared  township.

Economy

Once known for its religious schools, Dedemli is now a typical agricultural town. The most important crop is cherry. Beekeeping is another important sector.

References

Populated places in Konya Province
Towns in Turkey
Hadim District